Swinging was an Australian children's television show that aired on the ABC from 10 September 1997 until January 2001.

Characters

Main 
 Simone O'Brien as Rosy Turvey 
 Celia Ireland as Filameena Turvey
 Philip Dodd as Augustus Turvey 
 Emma De Vries as Tipsy Turvey

Recurring 
 Scott Bowie as Theodore Curly  
 Lisa Adam as Mitzi Tangle
 Mal Heap as Alf (talking tree)
 Terry Ryan as Bert (talking tree)

References 

1997 Australian television series debuts
Australian children's television series
Australian Broadcasting Corporation original programming
English-language television shows
Australian television shows featuring puppetry
Television series about monkeys